Ir. James F. Sundah (born James Freddy Sundah) is an Indonesian songwriter, of Manadonese descent. He was born in Semarang on December 1, 1955. A prominent figure in the Indonesian music industry, Sundah is best known for his evergreen song "Lilin Lilin Kecil" (Little Candles), sung by Chrisye (released in 1977). Which won the "Listeners' Favorite Choice" Award from the prominent Prambors Rasisonia Radio in Jakarta.

Career
Sundah's musical career began at a very young age. His father, Alfred Sundah, is known as one of the most important cultural figures in North Sulawesi especially for his efforts to preserving Kolintang and bamboo music.  He began playing for his father's recordings at the age of 8.

In 1977, Sundah got his breakthrough for winning the "Listeners' Favorite Choice" Award in the Youth Songwriting Competition (Lomba Cipta Lagu Remaja – LCLR) hosted by Prambors Radio.  The competition and the song are often credited as the turning point of the pop era in the Indonesian music industry. "Lilin-lilin Kecil" was on top of the Indonesian charts for more than one year and sent Chrisye to prominence. In the late 1970s, Sundah collaborated with Yockie Soerjoprajogo on Jurang Pemisah (The Severing Abyss). The album is considered a collectible and a high value item for Indonesian collectors.

He is credited for discovering the talents of Vina Panduwinata, Ruth Sahanaya, Krisdayanti, all of whom are considered Indonesian divas. He has worked with a wide range of musicians throughout his career including Vina Panduwinata, January Christy, Sheila Majid (Malaysian), Ismi Azis, Fairuz Hussein (Malaysian), Blue Diamond (Dutch), Victor Wood (Philippines), Ruth Sahanaya, Krisdayanti, Chrisye, Yockie Soerjoprajogo, Erwin Gutawa, and many others. Sundah was instrumental in the formation of the group Suara Persaudaraan (Voices of Brotherhood) in 1986, which, according to a Rolling Stones article, is considered as the largest "jamboree" of musicians of all times. Sundah participated in Pacific Harmony in 1995, and collaborated with top notch artistes from USA and Europe including Lois Walden and Cathy Dennis. With Titiek Puspa, Ahmad Albar, Bimbim Slank, Nicky Astria, Iwan Fals, Doel Sumbang, Franky Sahilatua and the Scorpions, he wrote "When You Came Into My Life", on their 1996 album Pure Instinct.  The song was later re-released as a Single and was produced by the award-winning producer David Foster.

Activism
"No Song, No Music Industry," is one of Sundah's most popular quotes that have been published by numerous media. A staunch advocate against piracy, Sundah is currently Chair of Information Technology Department at the Indonesian Association of Singers, Songwriters and Arrangers (PAPPRI), Indonesia's musician union, is also known an https://web.archive.org/web/20080318004731/http://www.suarapembaruan.com/News/2006/05/22/Editor/edit01.htm. He is also known an expert on cultural issues, often writes, and represents Indonesia in various forums abroad.

In Solo International Ethnic Music 2007, he introduced the concept of "Generasi Edan" (Madness Era), marked by the speedy development of technology. E-d-a-n, in Indonesian literally means madness, is a term coined by Rangga Warsita, a famous Javanese poet, predicting the coming of the madness era.  Creatively, Sundah broke down "edan" as an abbreviation of Electronic – Digital – Angka-angka (numbers) – New norm, explaining that to remain in tune with the world development today, one must adapt to the "new" things which were considered many years back.

Awards and honors
In addition to the "Listeners' Favorite Choice" Award in the Youth Songwriting Competition, Sundah won several BASF Awards, which is the highest award in Indonesian music, most notably for his work with Voices of Brotherhood, Ruth Sahanaya, and Krisdayanti. In 1996, Sundah's signature song "Little Candles" was chosen as the theme song of the International AIDS Memorial celebration in Indonesia.  In 2002, Minoru Endo Music Foundation in Japan selected "Little Candles" as one of South East Asian evergreen songs.

Personal life

Sundah is married to Lia Sundah Suntoso and has one child.  He made international headlines in 2009 when he had to re-take his driver's license exam three times because   he refused to pay bribes to the officials to get his lost copy replaced. He now lives in New York City with his family.

Discography
 Lilin-lilin Kecil (1977)
 Jurang Pemisah (1979)
 Citra Biru (1980)
 Citra Pesona (1982)
 Melayang (1986)
 Suara Persaudaraan (1986)
 Ozon (1989)
 Basa-Basi (1990)
 OST Catatan Si Emon (1991)
 Tak Kuduga (1989)
 Legenda (1990, re-released 2009)
 The Slow Collections (1990)
 Indonesian Top Ten (1990)
 Pure Instinct (1996)
And many others.

References

External links
  Republika Newspaper, August 25, 2010
 BBC News
  Kebudayaan, aset yang perlu dilindungi

1955 births
Living people
Minahasa people
Indonesian Christians
Indonesian songwriters
People from Semarang